The Science Centre Singapore, previously known as Singapore Science Centre is a scientific institution in Jurong East, Singapore, specialising in the promotion of scientific and technological education for the general public. It houses over 850 exhibits over eight exhibition galleries and receives over a million visitors every year. In 2003, it celebrated its silver jubilee.

History

The Science Centre was carved out of the National Museum of Singapore as a separate institution so that the latter could focus on its artistic and historical collections. This idea was first mooted in 1969 by the former Science Council of Singapore, now known as the Agency for Science, Technology and Research (A*Star), and was approved by the government.
 
The SCS building's design was decided by an architectural competition organised by the Science Centre Board, in which Raymond Woo architects' entry was selected. Built at a cost of S$12 million on a  site in Jurong East, it was officially opened on 10 December 1977 by Dr. Toh Chin Chye, the Minister-in-charge of the centre.

In 1987, the centre saw a significant expansion with the opening of Singapore's first and only OMNIMAX theatre, the Omni-Theatre. Costing $18 million, it has a 276-seat theatre underneath a  tilted dome.

In 1999, a $38 million renovation expanded the centre's exhibition space with larger open areas, a direct connection to the separate Omni-Theatre building, as well as a new entrance. In 2000, Snow City, a recreation of a  environment in tropical Singapore, was set up beside the Omni-Theatre.

On 7 December 2007, in its 30th anniversary year, the centre rebranded itself as the Science Centre Singapore (SCS).

Observatory

Location
Its unique position allows constellations in both the northern and southern celestial hemispheres to be observed.

Telescope
The equatorial mount for the telescopes was designed for Singapore's unique location; the accompanying English yoke provides the stability needed for the drive and tracking mechanisms. The  stainless steel dome can be made to swivel in any direction and its shutter can be made to slide open for the telescope to be focused on to interesting objects in the sky.

Stargazing sessions
The Observatory has been open to the public for stargazing sessions every Friday night since June 2006. The opening hours are from 7:50 to 10:00 pm. The Observatory can comfortably accommodate 50 visitors per session. It is important to note that stargazing through the observatory telescope is only possible when the sky is clear. However, regardless of weather conditions, the staff will be present.

Relocation plans
On 4 April 2008, the Urban Redevelopment Authority announced plans to relocate the Science Centre next to Chinese Garden MRT station within ten to 15 years.

On 24 May 2019, the Science Centre board awarded a multi-disciplinary team led by Architects 61 for the design of the new centre, expected to be ready by 2025. It said the team, which includes Zaha Hadid architects, submitted the "best proposal which reflected the boldness of scientific endeavour and future focused Stem aspirations".

The new design was unveiled on 2 December 2022, with completion now scheduled for 2027.

See also
 List of tourist attractions in Singapore

References

External links

1977 establishments in Singapore
Jurong East
Museums established in 1977
Science and technology in Singapore
Scientific organisations based in Singapore
Singapore
Singapore
Science museums in Singapore